Mount Kirs is the highest peak in the Karabakh Range of the Lesser Caucasus in Azerbaijan at an altitude of 2,725 metres. Before the 2020 Nagorno-Karabakh War, it was the highest mountain of the breakaway Republic of Arstakh. It forms the border between the Khojavend and Shusha districts of Azerbaijan.

Gallery

References 

Four-thousanders of the Caucasus
Mountains of Azerbaijan
Mountains of the Caucasus